Filip Marković (born 3 March 1992) is a Serbian professional footballer who plays as a forward.

Club career
Born in Čačak, Marković spent most of his graduated from FK Partizan's youth categories, but was promoted to FK Teleoptik, Partizan's farm team, instead of the main squad. On 14 August 2010 he made his debut as a professional, coming on as a late substitute in a 2–0 home success against FK Sinđelić Niš. He scored his first goal on 23 April of the following year, but in a 1–2 away loss against FK Radnički Sombor.

On 11 June 2013, Marković moved to S.L. Benfica, along with his brother Lazar, but was assigned to the reserves while his brother went straight to the main squad. He made his debut for the Encarnados on 1 September, again from the bench in a 1–1 away draw against F.C. Penafiel.

Marković scored his first goal for Benfica B on 6 November 2013, in a 4–4 home draw against C.F. União. He finished the campaign with 21 appearances, the vast majority as a substitute.

On 15 August 2014, Marković signed a two-year deal with the Spanish Segunda División's RCD Mallorca. He played 14 games for them – 5 starts – and scored once in a 4–1 win at UE Llagostera on 19 October.

Marković left Benfica on 9 July 2015, signing a three-year deal at Belgian top flight team Royal Excel Mouscron.

In August 2017, Marković  signed for RC Lens in France's Ligue 2. In his second season, he and Moussa Maâzou were completely frozen out by manager Philippe Montanier, and the club unsuccessfully aimed to offload him in January 2019.

Personal life
Marković's younger brother, Lazar, is also a footballer. A winger, he also came through in Partizan's youth setup.

References

External links
 
 
 

1992 births
Living people
Sportspeople from Čačak
Serbian footballers
Association football forwards
FK Teleoptik players
S.L. Benfica B players
RCD Mallorca players
Royal Excel Mouscron players
RC Lens players
Śląsk Wrocław players
FK Radnički Niš players
Belgian Pro League players
Ligue 2 players
Serbian SuperLiga players
Liga Portugal 2 players
Segunda División players
Ekstraklasa players
Serbian expatriate sportspeople in Portugal
Expatriate footballers in Portugal
Serbian expatriate sportspeople in Spain
Expatriate footballers in Spain
Serbian expatriate sportspeople in Belgium
Expatriate footballers in Belgium
Serbian expatriate sportspeople in France
Expatriate footballers in France
Serbian expatriate sportspeople in Poland
Expatriate footballers in Poland